François Nourissier (Paris, 18 May 1927–Paris, 15 February 2011) was a French journalist and writer.

Nourissier was the secretary-general of Éditions Denoël (1952–1955), editor of the review La Parisienne (1955–1958), and an adviser with the Éditions Grasset Paris publishing house (1958–1996).

In 1970, he won the Prix Femina for his book La crève. Several of his novels have been made into motion pictures and in 1973 he was a member of the Jury at the Cannes Film Festival.

François Nourissier was elected to the Académie Goncourt in 1977. He served as the literary organization's Secretary-General in 1983, and was its president from 1996 to 2002.

In 2002, he was awarded the Prix mondial Cino Del Duca.

On 15 February 2011 Francois Nourissier died at Sainte-Perine Hospital in Paris from the complications of Parkinson's disease.

Major works
 1951 : L'Eau Grise
 1956 : Les Orphelins d'Auteuil, Les Chiens à fouetter 
 1957 : Le Corps de Diane 
 1958 : Bleu comme la nuit
 1964 : Un petit bourgeois
 1965 : Une histoire française - Grand Prix du roman de l'Académie française
 1970 : La crève (Prix Femina)
 1973 : Allemande
 1981 : L'Empire des nuages
 1985 : La Fête des pères
 1992 : Le Gardien des ruines
 1997 : Le Bar de l'escadrille
 2001 : À défaut de génie
 2003 : Le prince des berlingots
 2008 : Eau-de-feu

References

1927 births
2011 deaths
Writers from Paris
20th-century French journalists
20th-century French novelists
21st-century French novelists
Prix Femina winners
Grand prix Jean Giono recipients
Grand Prix du roman de l'Académie française winners
French male novelists
20th-century French male writers
21st-century French male writers
French male non-fiction writers